Denmark participated in the Eurovision Song Contest 2007 with the song "Drama Queen" written by Peter Andersen, Simon Munk and Claus Christensen. The song was performed by DQ, which is the artistic name of singer and drag queen Peter Andersen. The Danish broadcaster DR organised the national final Dansk Melodi Grand Prix 2007 in order to select the Danish entry for the 2007 contest in Helsinki, Finland. The national selection consisted of two televised semi-finals, a radio wildcard selection and a televised final. In the final, the winner was selected by regional televoting. "Drama Queen" performed by DQ was the winner after gaining the most votes.

Denmark competed in the semi-final of the Eurovision Song Contest which took place on 10 May 2007. Performing during the show in position 12, "Drama Queen" was not announced among the top 10 entries of the semi-final and therefore did not qualify to compete in the final. It was later revealed that Denmark placed nineteenth out of the 28 participating countries in the semi-final with 45 points.

Background 

Prior to the 2007 contest, Denmark had participated in the Eurovision Song Contest thirty-five times since its first entry in 1957. In the 2006 contest, "Twist of Love" performed by Sidsel Ben Semmane placed eighteenth in the final.

The Danish national broadcaster, DR, broadcasts the event within Denmark and organises the selection process for the nation's entry. DR confirmed their intentions to participate at the 2007 Eurovision Song Contest on 7 June 2006. Denmark has selected all of their Eurovision entries through the national final Dansk Melodi Grand Prix. Along with their participation confirmation, the broadcaster announced that Dansk Melodi Grand Prix 2007 would be organised in order to select Denmark's entry for the 2007 contest.

Before Eurovision

Dansk Melodi Grand Prix 2007
Dansk Melodi Grand Prix 2007 was the 37th edition of Dansk Melodi Grand Prix, the music competition that selects Denmark's entries for the Eurovision Song Contest. The event included two semi-finals held on 26 January 2007 and 2 February 2007, a radio wildcard selection between 5 and 8 February 2007 followed by a final held on 10 February 2007. All shows in the competition were hosted by Camilla Ottesen and Adam Duvå Hall and televised on DR1 as well as streamed online at the official DR website.

Format 
Sixteen songs competed in the competition which consisted of two semi-finals and a final. Eight songs competed in each semi-final and the top four as determined exclusively by a public vote qualified to the final. The remaining non-qualifying songs proceeded to a wildcard selection where they were split into two groups. A public vote by listeners of DR P3 and DR P4 each selected two wildcards for the final from four songs competing in their groups. The winner in the final was determined again exclusively by a public vote. Viewers were able to vote via telephone or SMS.

Competing entries 
DR opened a submission period between 25 August 2006 and 2 October 2006 for composers to submit their entries. All composers and lyricists were required to be Danish citizens or have a strong connection to Denmark. The broadcaster received 475 entries during the submission period. A selection committee selected sixteen songs from the entries submitted to the broadcaster, while the artists of the selected entries were chosen by DR in consultation with their composers. DR held a press meet and greet at the DR Byen in Copenhagen on 7 December 2006 where the competing artists and songs were announced and officially presented. Among the artists was Aud Wilken who represented Denmark in the Eurovision Song Contest 1995, and Jørgen Olsen who won the 2000 Eurovision Song Contest as part of the Olsen Brothers.

Shows

Semi-finals 
The two semi-finals took place on 26 January and 2 February 2007 at the Musikteatret in Holstebro and the Aalborghallen in Aalborg, respectively. The top four of each semi-final advanced to the final based on a public vote. In addition to the performances of the competing entries, Flaskedrengene and Simone performed as the interval acts during the first semi-final, while Michel Lauziére performed as the interval act during the second semi-final.

Wildcard selection 
Listeners of DR P3 and DR P4 were able to vote for the songs competing in their respective groups between 5 and 8 February 2007. The song with the most votes in each group that advanced to the final were announced on 8 February 2007.

Final 
The final took place on 10 February 2007 at the Forum Horsens in Horsens. The running order was determined by DR and announced on 5 February 2007. The winner, "Drama Queen" performed by DQ, was selected solely by a public vote. The voting results of each of Denmark's five regions were converted to points which were distributed as follows: 4, 6, 8, 10 and 12 points. In addition to the performances of the competing entries, DK Rocks, Gordon Kennedy, Master Fatman and Take That performed as the interval acts.

Ratings

At Eurovision
According to Eurovision rules, all nations with the exceptions of the host country, the "Big Four" (France, Germany, Spain and the United Kingdom) and the ten highest placed finishers in the 2006 contest are required to qualify from the semi-final on 10 May 2007 in order to compete for the final on 12 May 2007. On 12 March 2007, a special allocation draw was held which determined the running order for the semi-final and Denmark was set to perform in position 12, following the entry from Albania and before the entry from Croatia.

The semi-final and final were broadcast on DR1 with commentary by Søren Nystrøm Rasted and Adam Duvå Hall. The Danish spokesperson, who announced the Danish votes during the final, was Susanne Georgi.

Semi-final 

DQ took part in technical rehearsals on 3 and 5 May, followed by dress rehearsals on 11 and 12 May. The Danish performance featured DQ wearing a headdress made from pink feathers and dressed in a black coat with silver sequins which was later removed to reveal a pink dress made of sequins underneath. DQ performed a choreographed routine with three backing vocalists and two dancers with the backing performers using pink feathers as part of the choreography. The LED screens displayed purple, pink and blue colours and pyrotechnic effects were used throughout the performance. The backing performers that joined DQ were: Christina Birksø, Christina Boelskifte, Claus Storgaard, David Boyd and René Winther.

At the end of the show, Denmark was not announced among the top 10 entries in the semi-final and therefore failed to qualify to compete in the final. It was later revealed that Denmark placed nineteenth in the semi-final, receiving a total of 45 points. The semi-final of the contest was watched by a total of 685 thousand viewers in Denmark.

Voting 
Below is a breakdown of points awarded to Denmark and awarded by Denmark in the semi-final and grand final of the contest. The nation awarded its 12 points to Hungary in the semi-final and to Sweden in the final of the contest.

Points awarded to Denmark

Points awarded by Denmark

References

2007
Countries in the Eurovision Song Contest 2007
Eurovision
Eurovision